Churi Qullu (Aymara churi dull yellow, qullu mountain, "dull yellow mountain", also spelled Churi Kkollu) is a  mountain in the Andes of Bolivia. It is located in the Oruro Department, Mejillones Province, Carangas Municipality, southeast of Carangas.

References 

Mountains of Oruro Department